The 2004 Elite League speedway season was the 70th season of the top division of speedway in the United Kingdom and governed by the Speedway Control Bureau (SCB), in conjunction with the British Speedway Promoters' Association (BSPA). Poole Pirates completed the double (league and cup winners) for the second year running. They were the first team to achieve this since Oxford Cheetahs in 1986.

Season summary
In 2004, the league increased to ten teams, with the Arena Essex Hammers and the Swindon Robins moving up from the Premier League. The title was decided by a play-off between the top five teams. The team that finished top of the table were seeded directly to the final and the next four met in quarter and semi final rounds. The winner of these rounds qualified for the final.

Poole Pirates dominated the season again and completed the 'double double' meaning winning the league and cup for two consecutive seasons. This had not been achieved since Oxford Cheetahs during the 1985 and 1986 seasons. Poole retained the majority of their 2003 squad, five time World Champion Tony Rickardsson, Magnus Zetterström, Antonio Lindbäck and Bjarne Pedersen but Ryan Sullivan was brought in from Peterborough to replace Leigh Adams who moved to Swindon.

Rickardsson topped the league averages but only raced part of the season returning to Sweden to spend more time with his family. Arguably Leigh Adams was the star rider of the season helping new Elite League side Swindon to a respectable mid-table position.

Final table

* Belle Vue v Peterborough not held

Play-offs
Quarter-final and Semi-final decided over one leg. Grand Final decided by aggregate scores over two legs.

Quarter-finals
Wolverhampton Wolves 61-33 Oxford Silver Machine
Ipswich Witches 55-39 Eastbourne Eagles

Semi-finals
Wolverhampton Wolves 45-45 Ipswich Witches (Mikael Max beat Hans Andersen in run-off)

Final

First leg

Second leg

The Poole Pirates were declared League Champions, winning on aggregate 112-71.

Elite League Knockout Cup
The 2004 Elite League Knockout Cup was the 66th edition of the Knockout Cup for tier one teams. Poole Pirates were the winners of the competition. Poole had started the final second leg under protest because of the Ipswich team changes that included a late replacement rider Davey Watt, who Poole considered was ineligible.

First round

Quarter-finals

Semi-finals

Final

First leg

Second leg

The Poole Pirates were declared Knockout Cup Champions, winning on aggregate 99-87.

Leading final averages

Rider & final averages
Arena Essex

 9.87
 6.67
 6.57
 6.18
 6.06
 6.02
 5.82
 5.66
 4.44

Belle Vue

 10.67
 7.40
 7.27
 7.25
 7.13
 7.10
 6.13
 6.03
 4.91
 4.73
 4.51
 3.68
 2.12
 1.57
 0.47

Coventry

 9.07
 7.11
 6.68
 6.49
 6.00
 5.85
 5.67
 4.76
 2.29
 1.05

Eastbourne

 9.95
 9.48
 8.18
 7.02
 5.00
 4.52
 4.20
 2.92
 2.42
 2.07

Ipswich

 9.33 
 8.59 
 8.29
 7.30 
 6.49
 5.96
 3.30
 1.41

Oxford

 9.83
 6.74
 6.60
 6.25
 6.25
 5.96
 5.20
 4.91

Peterborough

 8.62
 7.86
 6.86
 6.55
 5.40
 4.55
 4.00
 2.21

Poole

 10.89
 8.77
 8.66 
 8.63
 7.65
 6.29
 5.86
 5.43
 4.80
 4.72

Swindon

 10.83
 7.23
 6.98
 6.41
 6.05
 5.79
 3.89
 2.74

Wolverhampton

 9.39
 7.48
 7.37
 6.86
 6.52
 6.43
 5.59
 2.12

See also
 Speedway in the United Kingdom
 List of United Kingdom Speedway League Champions
 Knockout Cup (speedway)

References

SGB Premiership
2004 in British motorsport